Mitterdorf im Mürztal is a former municipality in the district of Bruck-Mürzzuschlag in the Austrian state of Styria. Since the 2015 Styria municipal structural reform, it is part of the municipality Sankt Barbara im Mürztal.

Geography
Mitterdorf lies in the valley of the Mürz about 13 km southwest of Mürzzuschlag. To the south are the Fischbach Alps.

References

Fischbach Alps
Cities and towns in Bruck-Mürzzuschlag District